The XX Constitutional Government of Portugal had Pedro Passos Coelho (PSD) as the prime minister and lasted from 30 October 2015 to 26 November 2015. It was the shortest-lived Portuguese national government since the Carnation Revolution.

Composition

References 

2015 establishments in Portugal
2015 disestablishments in Portugal
Cabinets established in 2015
Cabinets disestablished in 2015
Constitutional Governments of Portugal